Justin Anthony Hamilton (born April 1, 1990) is a Croatian-American professional basketball player for Guangdong Southern Tigers of the Chinese Basketball Association (CBA). He plays the center position.

College career 
Hamilton played college basketball for the Iowa State Cyclones from 2008 to 2010 under Greg McDermott, and Louisiana State University during the 2011–12 season under Trent Johnson after being required to redshirt the 2010–11 season due to NCAA transfer requirements.

Professional career 
Hamilton was selected with the 45th overall in the 2012 NBA draft by the Philadelphia 76ers. He was then traded to the Miami Heat for the rights of Arnett Moultrie.

In August 2012, Hamilton signed with KK Cibona and has expressed a desire to play for the Croatian national basketball team. In January 2013, he moved to VEF Rīga after an agreement with Cibona allowed him to switch clubs. He left the team in May.

On September 10, 2013, he signed with the Miami Heat. However, he was waived on October 26.

On October 31, 2013, he was acquired by the Sioux Falls Skyforce. On February 3, 2014, Hamilton was named to the Futures All-Star roster for the 2014 NBA D-League All-Star Game.

On March 4, 2014, he signed a 10-day contract with the Charlotte Bobcats. He made his only appearance for the Bobcats on March 8 in a loss to Memphis Grizzlies.

On March 14, 2014, he signed with the Miami Heat for the rest of the season. On March 20, 2014, he was assigned to the Sioux Falls Skyforce. On March 24, 2014, he was recalled by the Heat. The Heat made the 2014 NBA Finals, where they lost to the San Antonio Spurs in five games. Hamilton did not play a game in the 2014 playoffs for Miami.

On February 19, 2015, Hamilton was traded to the New Orleans Pelicans in a three-team trade involving the Phoenix Suns. On March 3, 2015, he was waived by the Pelicans before appearing in a game for them. Two days later, he was claimed off waivers by the Minnesota Timberwolves.

On July 27, 2015, Hamilton signed a one-year deal with Valencia of the Liga ACB and the Eurocup. Valencia reached the league's semi-finals and Hamilton earned All-Liga ACB First Team honours as the top power forward in the league.

On July 11, 2016, Hamilton signed a multi-year contract with the Brooklyn Nets. He made his debut for the Nets in their season opener on October 26, 2016 against the Boston Celtics. In 25 minutes off the bench, he recorded a career-high 19 points and 10 rebounds in a 122–117 loss. On December 20, 2016, he grabbed a career-high 11 rebounds in a 116–104 loss to the Toronto Raptors.

On July 13, 2017, Hamilton was traded to the Toronto Raptors in exchange for DeMarre Carroll, a future first-round pick and a future second-round pick. The next day, he was waived by the Raptors.

On July 22, 2017, Hamilton signed with the Beijing Ducks of the Chinese Basketball Association.

On August 14, 2022, he has signed with Baxi Manresa of the Liga ACB.

NBA career statistics

Regular season

|-
| style="text-align:left;"| 
| style="text-align:left;"| Charlotte
| 1 || 0 || 4.0 || .000 || .000 || .000 || .0 || .0 || 1.0 || .0 || .0
|-
| style="text-align:left;"| 
| style="text-align:left;"| Miami
| 7 || 0 || 9.7 || .450 || .333 || 1.000 || 1.0 || .0 || .6 || .0 || 3.7
|-
| style="text-align:left;"| 
| style="text-align:left;"| Miami
| 24 || 5 || 12.0 || .415 || .316 || .857 || 2.0 || .5 || .3 || .2 || 2.8
|-
| style="text-align:left;"| 
| style="text-align:left;"| Minnesota
| 17 || 9 || 24.9 || .513 || .333 || .825 || 5.1 || 1.4 || 1.1 || 1.5 || 9.0
|-
| style="text-align:left;"| 
| style="text-align:left;"| Brooklyn
| 64 || 7 || 18.4 || .459 || .306 || .750 || 4.1 || 0.9 || 0.5 || 0.7 || 6.9 
|- class="sortbottom"
| style="text-align:center;" colspan="2"| Career
| 113 || 21 || 13.8 || .367 || .258 || .686 || 2.4 || .6 || .5 || .5 || 4.5

Personal life 
Hamilton is of Croatian ancestry on his mother side, who is from Zagreb, Croatia. Hamilton spent 1 year of his life in Croatia, attending the elementary school "Pantovčak" in Zagreb.

References

External links 

LSU Tigers bio
RealGM profile

1990 births
Living people
American expatriate basketball people in China
American expatriate basketball people in Croatia
American expatriate basketball people in Latvia
American expatriate basketball people in Spain
American men's basketball players
American people of Croatian descent
Basketball players from California
Basketball players from Utah
Beijing Ducks players
BK VEF Rīga players
Brooklyn Nets players
Centers (basketball)
Charlotte Bobcats players
Iowa State Cyclones men's basketball players
KK Cibona players
Liga ACB players
LSU Tigers basketball players
Miami Heat players
Minnesota Timberwolves players
Philadelphia 76ers draft picks
Sioux Falls Skyforce players
Valencia Basket players